The Rupertswood Football Netball Club, nicknamed the Sharks, is an Australian rules football club, and situated 40 km north west of Melbourne in the town of Sunbury and affiliated with the Essendon District Football League.

Rupertswood joined in full in 2013. It had been fielding juniors for some years. The senior side transferred in from the VAFA.

Premierships
 VAFA Club XXVIII 2000
 VAFA Division D4 2002
 VAFA Division D1 2009
 RDFNL Seniors 2019

References

External links
 Rupertswood Football Netball Club

Books
History of Football in the Bendigo District - John Stoward - 

Riddell District Football League clubs
1999 establishments in Australia
Multi-sport clubs in Australia
Sports clubs established in 1999
Australian rules football clubs established in 1999
Australian rules football clubs in Victoria (Australia)
Sport in the City of Melton
Sunbury, Victoria